Concord is an unincorporated community in Williamsburg township in Clermont County, in the U.S. state of Ohio.

History
The first settlement at Concord was made in 1815. The post office at Concord was called Angola. This post office was established in 1855, and closed in 1872.

References

Unincorporated communities in Clermont County, Ohio
Unincorporated communities in Ohio